Forbidden Fruit is an album by Marion Meadows released in April 1994 on Novus Records.
The album rose to No. 7 on the Billboard Contemporary Jazz Albums chart and No. 8 on the Billboard Jazz Albums chart.

Track listing
"Red Light" 	- 5:12
"You're Always on My Mind" 	Morgan - 4:52
"Asha" - 5:56
"Forbidden Fruit"  - 5:47
"Whenever Your Heart Wants to Sing"  - 4:41
"You Will Never Know What You're Missing"  -  5:09
"Back 2 Back" 	-  5:15
"Save the Best for Last" 	-  3:34
"Somewhere Island" 	-  4:50
"Comin' Home to You" 	-  4:58
"Nocturnal Serenade"

References

1994 albums
Marion Meadows albums